Juan Ignacio Cerra (born 16 October 1976 in Santa Fe) is a male hammer thrower from Argentina. His personal best throw is 76.42 metres, achieved in July 2001 in Trieste. This is also the South American record.

Career
He won the gold medal at the 2003 Pan American Games. He also has a bronze medal from the 1999 Pan American Games, and won the 1998 South American Games. He participated at the World Championships in Athletics in 1999, 2001, 2003 and 2005 as well as the Summer Olympics in 2000, 2004, 2008 and 2012  without reaching the final. He won the Konex Award Merit Diploma in 2010 as one of the five best Atletes from the last decade in Argentina.

Personal bests
Hammer throw: 76.42 m –  Trieste, 25 July 2001

Competition record

References

External links
 
 
 
 
 
 Tilastopaja biography

1976 births
Living people
Argentine male hammer throwers
Olympic athletes of Argentina
Athletes (track and field) at the 2000 Summer Olympics
Athletes (track and field) at the 2004 Summer Olympics
Athletes (track and field) at the 2008 Summer Olympics
Athletes (track and field) at the 2012 Summer Olympics
Pan American Games gold medalists for Argentina
Pan American Games bronze medalists for Argentina
Pan American Games medalists in athletics (track and field)
Athletes (track and field) at the 1999 Pan American Games
Athletes (track and field) at the 2003 Pan American Games
Athletes (track and field) at the 2007 Pan American Games
Athletes (track and field) at the 2011 Pan American Games
Medalists at the 1999 Pan American Games
Medalists at the 2003 Pan American Games
Medalists at the 2007 Pan American Games
South American Games gold medalists for Argentina
South American Games bronze medalists for Argentina
South American Games medalists in athletics
Competitors at the 1998 South American Games
Competitors at the 2014 South American Games
Athletes from Buenos Aires